The 1997 Umbria and Marche earthquake occurred in the regions of Umbria and Marche, central Italy on the morning of September 26.  It was preceded by a foreshock almost as strong as the main quake.  The foreshock occurred at 02:33 CEST (00:33 UTC), rated , and the second – the main shock – occurred at 11:40 CEST (09:40 UTC), rated . Their epicentre was in Annifo. The mainshock was assigned X (Extreme) and foreshock VIII (Severe) on the Mercalli intensity scale.

There were several thousands of foreshocks and aftershocks from May 1997 to April 1998, more than thirty of which had a magnitude more than 3.5. Eleven people are known to have died following the shocks.

List of foreshocks and aftershocks
Only shocks (both foreshocks and aftershocks) with magnitude 5.0 or higher are listed.

See also
 List of earthquakes in 1997
 List of earthquakes in Italy
 Earthquake engineering

Notes

Further reading

External links
 CFTI4med
 Earthquake Assisi, Italy - Terremoto Assisi, Italia 1997 - The only existing video footage of the quake, showing the moment it destroyed the Basilica of Saint Francis of Assisi.
 

Umbria and Marche earthquake
Umbria and Marche earthquake
1997 Umbria and Marche earthquake
Filmed deaths during natural disasters
September 1997 events in Europe
1997 disasters in Italy